Arvonia is an unincorporated community in Buckingham County, Virginia founded mainly by Welsh immigrants during the 19th century.  The town derives its name from the county of Caernarfon, Wales (until the 1970s two Englished spellings were in use - Carnarvon and Caernarvon). The county is known popularly simply as Arfon (in English spelling, Arvon). "Arvonia" is the Latin form of the name. Its major industry has been slate mining. The slate is known primarily for its color and durability, and is featured on many prominent American buildings, such as the Smithsonian Castle, and the University of Virginia. 
In 1885 Arvon Presbyterian Church was founded to serve the many Welsh miners in the Slate Quarry. The sanctuary portion of the church was destroyed by fire in 2009 and after being rebuilt to its original design, it reopened on Palm Sunday, April 12, 2012.

Bryn Arvon and Gwyn Arvon, in Arvonia, are listed on the National Register of Historic Places.  Guerrant House and Seven Islands Archeological and Historic District, also NRHP-listed, are both near Arvonia.

References

External links
Slate from Arvonia

Unincorporated communities in Buckingham County, Virginia
Welsh-American culture in Virginia